The 2014 Women's Basketball Invitational (WBI) was a single-elimination tournament of 16 National Collegiate Athletic Association (NCAA) Division I teams that did not participate in the 2014 NCAA Division I women's basketball tournament or 2014 WNIT. The field of 16 was announced on March 17, 2014. All games were hosted by the higher seed throughout the tournament, unless the higher seed's arena was unavailable. The championship game was hosted by the school with the higher end of the season RPI. The tournament was won by the UIC Flames of the University of Illinois Chicago.

Bracket

West Region

East Region

*#7 Maine will host #2 Bucknell in First round.

WBI Championship Game

See also
 2014 NCAA Division I women's basketball tournament
 2014 Women's National Invitation Tournament
 Women's Basketball Invitational

References

Women's Basketball Invitational
Women's Basketball Invitational